Röthenbach may refer to:

in Germany
in Bavaria
Röthenbach an der Pegnitz, a city
Röthenbach (Allgäu), a municipality
Röthenbach bei Sankt Wolfgang, part of the municipality of Wendelstein
Röthenbach (Altdorf bei Nürnberg), part of the municipality of Altdorf bei Nürnberg
Röthenbach bei Schweinau, in the city of Nürnberg
Röthenbach (Arzberg Oberfranken), in the municipality of Arzberg (Oberfranken), Wunsiedel im Fichtelgebirge
Röthenbach (Griesstätt), in the municipality of Griesstätt, Rosenheim
Röthenbach (Reuth bei Erbendorf), in the municipality of Reuth bei Erbendorf, Tirschenreuth
Röthenbach (Kohlberg), in the municipality of Kohlberg (Oberpfalz), Neustadt an der Waldnaab
in Saxony
Röthenbach (Rodewisch), in the municipality of Rodewisch, Vogtlandkreis
Röthenbach (Pretzschendorf), in the municipality of Pretzschendorf, Weißeritzkreis
in Switzerland
Röthenbach bei Herzogenbuchsee, a municipality in the canton of Berne
Röthenbach im Emmental, a municipality in the canton of Berne

See also
Rothenbach (disambiguation)